Ebenezer Annan (born 21 August 2002) is a Ghanaian professional footballer who plays as a defender for Italian  club Imolese on loan from Bologna.

Club career 
Annan joined Bologna in 2020. He became a key figure in their Primavera squad, featuring in several games between 2020 and 2022. Annan was first called up to the senior team in August 2021 during Bologna's 2021–22 preseason tour. Ahead of Bologna's Coppa Italia game against Ternana he was called up again in the process making his professional debut in that game on 16 August 2021, starting and playing 56 minutes before being substituted for Musa Barrow as Bologna lost by 5–4. He was subsequently named on the bench for their Serie A match against Salernitana on 22 August. On 22 January 2022, he made his Serie A debut after coming on for Arthur Theate in the 66th minute in their 2–1 defeat to Hellas Verona.

Career statistics

Club 

 As of 22 January 2022.

References

External links 
 
 

2002 births
Living people
Ghanaian footballers
Association football defenders
Bologna F.C. 1909 players
Imolese Calcio 1919 players
Serie A players
Serie C players
Ghanaian expatriate footballers
Ghanaian expatriate sportspeople in Italy
Expatriate footballers in Italy